On May 15th, 2022, three Pakistan Army soldiers and three children were killed after a suicide attack occurred near Miranshah, North Waziristan, according to the Inter-Services Public Relations (ISPR). The Pakistani military's media affairs wing identified the murdered soldiers as 33-year-old Lance Havaldar Zubair Qadir from Pakpattan, 21-year-old Sepoy Uzair Asfar from Haripur and 22-year-old Sepoy Qasim Maqsood from Multan. An 11-year-old, eight-year-old, and four-year-old child also died from the blast.

"Intelligence agencies are investigating to find out about [the] suicide bomber and his handlers/facilitators," the statement concluded.

Prime Minister Shehbaz Sharif condemned the suicide attack, stating "The killers of innocent children are the enemies of both Islam and humanity." He expressed grief over the lives lost. Sharjeel Memon also made a public statement condemning the attack.

See also
 December 2022 Miranshah suicide bombing

References 

2022 murders in Pakistan
May 2022 crimes in Asia
May 2022 events in Pakistan
Mass murder in 2022
Mass murder in Pakistan
Suicide bombings in 2022
Suicide bombings in Pakistan
Terrorist incidents in Pakistan in 2022